Shorea blumutensis (called, along with some other species in the genus Shorea, yellow meranti) is a species of plant in the family Dipterocarpaceae. It native to Sumatra and Peninsular Malaysia.

References

blumutensis
Trees of Sumatra
Trees of Peninsular Malaysia
Taxonomy articles created by Polbot